Lighthouse Metro station is a Metro railway station under construction in phase II of the Chennai Metro. The station is one among the 30 stations along Line 4 of the Chennai Metro and one of the 12 underground stations in that corridor. It is the terminal station for the stretch between Lighthouse and Poonamallee Bypass. The station will serve the neighbourhoods of Triplicane, Mylapore, and Santhome.

History
Construction of the station began in 2021. The construction is being funded by Asian Development Bank (ADB).

Construction

The station
Lighthouse is an underground metro station situated on Line 4. It will be built at a depth of about 18 to 20 metres below the ground. It will be built at the Dr. Radhakrishnan Salai and Kamarajar Salai junction, beneath the Gandhi statue on the Marina beach.

Station layout
There will be two entrances for the Lighthouse metro station, one of which will be near the lighthouse.

Facilities
It has been estimated that by 2025, about 5,000 people would be using the Lighthouse metro station every day.

See also

 Chennai Metro
 Light House railway station
 List of Chennai metro stations
 Railway stations in Chennai
 Chennai Mass Rapid Transit System
 Chennai Monorail
 Chennai Suburban Railway
 Transport in Chennai
 Urban rail transit in India
 List of metro systems

References

External links
 

 UrbanRail.Net – descriptions of all metro systems in the world, each with a schematic map showing all stations.

Chennai Metro stations
Railway stations in Chennai